General González may refer to:

Abraham González (general) (1782–c. 1838), Argentine general
Juan Picasso González (1857–1935), Spanish general
Lázaro Chacón González (1873–1931), Guatemalan general
Miguel Alemán González (1884–1929), Mexican general
Romualdo Palacio González (1827–1908), Spanish general

See also
Ambrosio José Gonzales (1818–1893), Cuban revolutionary general